Kerner may refer to:

 Kerner (grape), a variety of white grape
 Kerner Commission, established in 1967 by President Lyndon B. Johnson to investigate the causes of race riots in the United States
 Kerner Optical, a motion picture visual effects company
 Durand–Kerner method, root-finding algorithm for solving polynomial equations in numerical analysis

People

Literature
 Elizabeth Kerner (born 1958), fantasy author
 Justinus Kerner (1786–1862), a German lyric poet of the Swabian school

Politics
 Johann Georg Kerner (1770–1812), political journalist, critical chronicler of the French revolution, brother of Justinus Kerner
 Otto Kerner, Jr. (1908–1976), Illinois Governor and judge on the United States Court of Appeals for the Seventh Circuit
 Otto Kerner, Sr. (1884–1952), an Illinois Attorney General and judge on the United States Court of Appeals for the Seventh Circuit

Entertainment and media
 Debby Kerner, American singer
 Nena (Gabriele Susanne Kerner; born 1960), German singer who became famous with the New German Wave songs "Nur geträumt" and "99 Luftballons"
 Jordan Kerner, film producer
 Johannes B. Kerner, (born 1964), German television broadcaster

Sports
 Jonathan Kerner (born 1974), American basketball player
 Marlon Kerner (born 1973), American football player

Science and mathematics
 Boris Kerner, (born 1947), German physicist
 Anton Kerner von Marilaun (1831–1898), Austrian botanist

Other fields
 Ian Kerner, American sex counselor

See also 
 Kerning, adjusting the spaces between typeset letters

Occupational surnames
Surnames of Bavarian origin